Nuiqsut is a city in North Slope Borough, Alaska, United States. The population was 512 at the 2020 Census and 92.5% Alaska Native. It is located in the midst of a vast quantity of oil reserves and the closest community to a controversial ConocoPhillips oil drilling project named Willow Project in the Alpine, Alaska oil field of the National Petroleum Reserve–Alaska.

Geography
Nuiqsut is located at  (70.216338, -151.005725).

It is located on the Colville River, about 5 miles north of its confluence with the Itkillik River. 

Air travel to the Nuiqsut Airport provides the only year-round access to Nuiqsut. Nuiqsut is accessible during the winter via an ice road. It is about 10 miles South of Alpine, Alaska and about 80 miles West of Prudhoe Bay, Alaska

Demographics

Nuiqsut incorporated in 1975 and first appeared on the 1980 U.S. Census as an incorporated city.

As of the 2000 census  there were 433 people, 110 households, and 90 families living in the city.

As of the 2010 United States Census, there were 402 people living in the city. The racial makeup of the city was 87.1% Native American, 10.0% White, 0.2% Black and 2.7% from two or more races.

There were 126 housing units at an average density of 13.7 per square mile (5.3/km2). The racial makeup of the city was 88.22% Native American, 10.16% White, 0.23% Black or African American,  0.46% Asian, and 0.92% from two or more races. Hispanic or Latino of any race were 0.23% of the population.

There were 110 households, out of which 54.5% had children under the age of 18 living with them, 42.7% were married couples living together, 22.7% had a female householder with no husband present, and 17.3% were non-families. 15.5% of all households were made up of individuals, and 0.9% had someone living alone who was 65 years of age or older.  The average household size was 3.93 and the average family size was 4.24.

In the city, the population was spread out, with 42.0% under 18, 9.5% from 18 to 24, 30.5% from 25 to 44, 13.6% from 45 to 64, and 4.4% who were 65 or older.  The median age was 24 years. For every 100 females, there were 147.4 males.  For every 100 females age 18 and over, there were 130.3 males.

The median income for a household in the city was $48,036, and the median income for a family was $46,875. Males had a median income of $31,667 versus $25,625 for females. The per capita income for the city was $14,876.  About 3.2% of families and 2.4% of the population were below the poverty line, including 1.1% of those under age 18 and none of those age 65 or over.

Economy, commerce and social centers

There is one commercial store in Nuiqsut, one mail receiving location (operated by the City of Nuiqsut not the United States Postal Service), and one church (Presbyterian).  Other areas of social activity include the city recreation center and the school. An elder's living center is also present.

Since 1973, Nuiqsut has a Alaska Native corporation in form of a village corporation named "Kuukpik", in which more than 600 shareholders are enrolled. 

Before 2001, Nuiqsut s economy was primarily subsistence-based. 
When ConocoPhillips found oil and gas at the Alpine, Alaska oil field to which and Kuukpik owns the surface rights, it negotiated a surface-use agreement.
Since oil production began in 2001, Kuukpik has been receiving a small royalty from ConocoPhillips. It was the first Native village impacted in this way. The subsurface rights of the Alpine field, however, are with the regional Arctic Slope Regional Corporation.

Since May 2018, ConocoPhillips has officially requested to develop the so called Willow project oil field from the Bureau of Land Management. Kuukpik submitted comments to the draft Environmental Impact Statement reducing drill sites to four, shorter gravel roads and requesting protection of Teshekpuk Lake amongst other things. As of March 2023, Mayor Rosemary Ahtuangaruak opposes the project, because of impacts on caribou and subsistence lifestyle.

Education
There is one school in Nuiqsut for grades kindergarten through 12th grade, Nuiqsut Trapper School of the North Slope Borough School District. The school also provides preschool. There are approximately 100 students. There are approximately 12 teachers and 6 other staff members.  Many community functions are held in the school and it serves as social center as well as school. The school facilities also serve as an emergency shelter for the community in times of power outages.

Culture and history
The native people of the village are Iñupiat. 
In the early 1970s, the village was re-established, when the residents moved to the region from Utqiaġvik. For one year they lived in tents while housing was built. These original residents were the first to receive dividends from the oil companies in exchange for land use. The dividends are passed from the original shareholders on to the community member of their choice (often parent to child).

Native traditions such as hunting (whale, caribou, fox, ptarmigan, etc.) and the making of native clothes and crafts continues, although the influence of modern society has reduced both need and interest in these activities to some degree. The traditional whale hunted by the whalers of Nuiqsut is the bowhead whale.

In 2022, a gas leak forced some villagers to evacuate their homes. 
In 2023, Nuiqsut officials criticized the Bureau of Land Management’s (BLM) public input process for ConocoPhillips so called Willow project, as the BLM denied to extend the public comment period without explanation.

Natural resources
Nuiqsut is located in the midst of a vast quantity of oil. Many major oil companies have oil facilities in the region (ConocoPhillips, Hilcorp, etc.).  The relationship with the community of Nuiqsut is such that the oil company using the land, considered to be the property of the native Nuiqsut residents (Inupiat Eskimos), pay dividends to residents in exchange for use of the land. For many native residents, the dividends are the primary, or only, source of income, but the region's local development and global fossil fuel-generated climate disruption has had major negative impacts on their traditional hunting, fishing and whaling activities. Permafrost thawing, rising sea levels and warming of the Arctic Ocean present a cash-versus-culture conundrum to the inhabitants.

Climate

In popular culture
It was featured in season four episode one of the History television channel series Ice Road Truckers, when a convoy of truckers delivered supplies to the village.

References

Cities in North Slope Borough, Alaska
Populated places of the Arctic United States
Cities in Alaska